A referendum on becoming part of Nigeria was held in the Northern Cameroons in November 1959. Voters were given the choice between a union with Nigeria and postponing the decision. Voters favoured the latter, with 62.25% voting to postpone the decision. A second referendum was held in 1961, with 60% voting to join Nigeria and 40% voting to join Cameroon.

Results

References

1959 referendums
Referendums in Nigeria
British Cameroon
1959 in British Cameroon